The 1997 Football League Cup Final was played between Middlesbrough and Leicester City. The first game at Wembley Stadium on Sunday, 6 April 1997 ended in a 1–1 draw after extra time. Fabrizio Ravanelli opened the scoring only for Leicester's Emile Heskey to equalise in the last minute of extra time. Heskey was fortunate to be on the field having committed what was a bookable foul on Boro captain Nigel Pearson after already being booked. Leicester won the replay, and their second League Cup, in the game played at Hillsborough Stadium on 16 April 1997 with another extra-time goal, this time from Steve Claridge.

This was the last year that the Football League Cup Final was decided by a replay.

Road to Wembley

Match details

Replay

References

External links

League Cup Final
EFL Cup Finals
League Cup Final 1997
League Cup Final 1997
Football League Cup Final
Football League Cup Final